is a Japanese politician of the Democratic Party of Japan, a member of the House of Councillors in the Diet (national legislature). A native of Goshogawara, Aomori and graduate of Kanto Gakuin University and Keio University, he was elected for the first time in 2007.

References

External links 
 Official website in Japanese.

1969 births
Living people
People from Goshogawara
Members of the House of Councillors (Japan)
Keio University alumni
Democratic Party of Japan politicians
Kanto Gakuin University alumni
Politicians from Aomori Prefecture